Kallio is a district and a neighbourhood in Helsinki, the capital of Finland.

Kallio may also refer to:

 Kallio (surname), a Finnish surname
 Lex Kallio, a Finnish law named after President Kyösti Kallio
 Kallio (TV series), a Finnish television series written by Juha Jokela
 Maria Kallio, a novel series by Leena Lehtolainen

See also 
 
 Kalio, an Indonesian meat dish